Lal Babu Pandit, is a Nepalese politician from Nepal Communist Party and was the  Minister of Federal Affairs and General Administration under Second Oli cabinet. He was elected to the House of Representatives from Morang - 6 in the 2017 election by defeating Congress candidate Shekhar Koirala. He was elected to the First and Second Constituent Assembly under Proportional Representation system.

Minister of General Administration
He was the Minister of General Administration under Sushil Koirala led government during which he gained publicity for his campaign against officials holding Permanent Resident status of other countries.

Action against Permanent Residency holders
In 2014 he garnered attention for creating a list of 1,100 senior government officials who hold permanent residency in foreign countries and announced to take action against the people on the list. He claimed that he received a number of death threats for his controversial action to disallow permanent residency holding government officials from the service.

Action against dilly-dallying government employees
He has warned of taking action against the employees who dillydally while providing services to the service seekers during the government's new administrative system of twelve-hour-long service which includes two shifts in a day.

Electoral history
1991 Pratinidhi Sabha Election Morang

1994 Pratinidhi Sabha Election Morang

1999 Pratinidhi Sabha Election Morang-2

2017 Pratinidhi Sabha Election Morang-6

Bibliography 
 Singhadurbar Badalne Sangharsha (2017)

References

Living people
Communist Party of Nepal (Unified Marxist–Leninist) politicians
Government ministers of Nepal
People from Biratnagar
Nepal Communist Party (NCP) politicians
Nepal MPs 2017–2022
Nepal MPs 1991–1994
Nepal MPs 1999–2002
Nepalese memoirists
Members of the 1st Nepalese Constituent Assembly
1958 births